Fametesta mirabilis is a species of air-breathing land snail, a small terrestrial pulmonate gastropod mollusc in the family Charopidae.

This is an endangered species.

Distribution
This species (and indeed the whole genus) is endemic to Japan.

References

Molluscs of Japan
Endodontidae
Gastropods described in 1902
Taxonomy articles created by Polbot
Taxobox binomials not recognized by IUCN